The Giant's Dance or Giants' Dance is a stone circle in an Arthurian legend first documented  in Historia Regum Britanniae.

In the Merlin legend 
Geoffrey of Monmouth described it as a megalithic stone circle, whose stones were used to build the neolithic Stonehenge on Salisbury Plain in England.

According to Geoffrey, the wizard Merlin disassembled a circle at Mount Killaraus in Ireland and had men drag the stones to Wiltshire, and had giants assemble Stonehenge.

Modern use of name
In modern use Giants Dance has been used to refer to:

 A fictional stone circle that was moved from Ireland to Britain by Merlin
 Stonehenge, England: the megalithic stone circle
 Waun Mawn, Wales: a proposed identification of the dismantled megalithic stone circle

References

Stone circles in Europe
Arthurian legend
British folklore
Stonehenge
Pembrokeshire